Alfred Henry "Freddy" Heineken (4 November 1923 – 3 January 2002) was a Dutch businessman for Heineken International, the brewing company bought in 1864 by his grandfather Gerard Adriaan Heineken in Amsterdam. He served as chairman of the board of directors and CEO from 1971 until 1989. After his retirement as chairman and CEO, Heineken continued to sit on the board of directors until his death and served as chairman of the supervisory board from 1989 till 1995. At the time of his death, Heineken was one of the richest people in the Netherlands, with a net worth of 9.5 billion guilders.

Early life 
Heineken was born on 4 November 1923 in Amsterdam. He was the grandson of Gerard Adriaan Heineken, who was the founder of the brewery Heineken International.

Career 
On 1 June 1941, he entered the service of the Heineken company, which by then was no longer owned by the family. He bought back stock several years later, to ensure the family controlled the company again. He created the Heineken Holding that owned 50.005% of Heineken International; he personally held a majority stake in Heineken Holding. By the time of his resignation as chairman of the board in 1989 he had transformed Heineken from a brand that was known primarily in the Netherlands into a brand name recognized worldwide.

Kidnapping 

Freddy Heineken and his driver Ab Doderer were kidnapped in 1983 and released on a ransom of 35 million Dutch guilders (around 15,800,000 euros). The kidnappers – Cor van Hout, Willem Holleeder, Jan Boellaard, Frans Meijer, and Martin Erkamps – were eventually caught and served prison terms. Before being extradited, Van Hout and Holleeder stayed for more than three years in France, first on the run, then in prison, and then, awaiting a change of the extradition treaty, under house arrest, and finally in prison again. Meijer escaped and lived in Paraguay for years, until he was discovered by reporter Peter R. de Vries and imprisoned there. In 2003, Meijer stopped resisting his extradition to the Netherlands, and was transferred to a Dutch prison to serve the last part of his term.

The films The Heineken Kidnapping (2011) and Kidnapping Freddy Heineken (2015) are based on this incident.

Personal life 
Heineken married Lucille Cummins, an American from a Kentucky family of bourbon whiskey distillers. Heineken died from pneumonia on 3 January 2002 at the age of 78 in his home in Noordwijk in the presence of his immediate family, including his daughter Charlene de Carvalho-Heineken. Heineken struggled for some time with deteriorating health; in 1999 he suffered a mild stroke but recovered. Shortly before his death he broke his arm in a fall. Heineken was buried at the General Cemetery in Noordwijk. Heineken's daughter inherited his fortune. Heineken was a member of the People's Party for Freedom and Democracy (VVD).

Heineken, in 1989, illegally destroyed the Villa Böhler in Oberalpina, designed by Heinrich Tessenow from 1916-18.

In popular culture 
A film of the kidnapping, De Heineken Ontvoering, with Rutger Hauer playing Freddy Heineken, was released in October 2011. A second film, Kidnapping Mr. Heineken, based on De Vries' book about the kidnapping, was produced by Informant Media in 2013 based on the scenario written by William Brookfield. In this film Heineken is played by Anthony Hopkins with the kidnappers played by Jim Sturgess, Sam Worthington, Ryan Kwanten, Mark van Eeuwen and Thomas Cocquerel.

Book 
 The United States of Europe, A Eurotopia?, 1992.

See also 
List of kidnappings
List of solved missing person cases

References

External links 
 

1923 births
2002 deaths
20th-century Dutch businesspeople
Dutch corporate directors
Dutch investors
Dutch stock traders
Dutch billionaires
Dutch public relations people
Dutch chief executives in the food industry
Chief marketing officers
Chairmen of Heineken International
Stockbrokers
Heineken people
Dutch expatriates in the United States
Kidnapped businesspeople
Marketing theorists
Market researchers
Dutch marketing people
Members of the People's Party for Freedom and Democracy
Dutch brewers
Businesspeople from Amsterdam
Kidnapped Dutch people
People from Noordwijk